The 1991 Currie Cup (known as the Bankfin Currie Cup for sponsorship reasons) was the top division of the Currie Cup competition, the premier domestic rugby union competition in South Africa. This was the 53rd season since the competition started in 1889 and the first time it was known as the Bankfin Currie Cup, following the sponsors' name change from Santam Bank.

Teams

Changes between 1990 and 1991 seasons

Changes between 1991 and 1992 seasons
 None

Competition

There were six participating teams in the 1991 Currie Cup. These teams played each other twice over the course of the season, once at home and once away. Teams received two points for a win and one points for a draw. The top two teams qualified for the finals.

However, with teams tied on points, play-offs would be held to determine the finalists.

In addition, all the Currie Cup teams also played in the 1991 Currie Cup / Central Series.

Log

Fixtures and results

Round one

Round two

Round three

Round four

Round five

Round six

Round seven

Round eight

Round nine

Round ten

Round eleven

Round twelve

Quarter-final

Semi-final

Final

See also
 1991 Currie Cup / Central Series
 1991 Currie Cup Central A
 1991 Currie Cup Central B
 1991 Currie Cup Central / Rural Series
 1991 Currie Cup Rural C
 1991 Currie Cup Rural D
 1991 Lion Cup

References